Daniel Lopes da Silva (born 10 February 1983, in Sobral), known as Daniel Sobralense, is a Brazilian footballer who plays for Campinense as an attacking midfielder.

Career statistics

Honours

Club
Fortaleza
Campeonato Cearense: 2004, 2007, 2016

Parnahyba
Campeonato Piauiense: 2006

Kalmar FF
Allsvenskan: 2008
Svenska Supercupen: 2009

IFK Göteborg
Svenska Cupen: 2012–13

Paysandu
 Campeonato Paraense: 2017

References

External links
 

1983 births
Living people
Brazilian footballers
Brazilian expatriate footballers
Campeonato Brasileiro Série A players
Campeonato Brasileiro Série B players
Campeonato Brasileiro Série C players
Campeonato Brasileiro Série D players
Allsvenskan players
Guarany Sporting Club players
Fortaleza Esporte Clube players
Parnahyba Sport Club players
Associação Desportiva Recreativa e Cultural Icasa players
Clube Náutico Capibaribe players
Kalmar FF players
IFK Göteborg players
Örebro SK players
Paysandu Sport Club players
Santa Cruz Futebol Clube players
Campinense Clube players
Association football midfielders
Expatriate footballers in Sweden
Brazilian expatriate sportspeople in Sweden
People from Sobral, Ceará
Sportspeople from Ceará